Andre Lewis (born 12 August 1994) is a Jamaican professional footballer who currently plays for Hartford Athletic in the USL Championship.

Career

Club 
Lewis began his career with Cavalier, he later played football for Jamaican club Portmore United before being spotted by MLS scouts and was entered in the 2014 MLS SuperDraft.

On 16 January 2014 Lewis was selected in the first round (7th overall) of the 2014 MLS SuperDraft by the Vancouver Whitecaps FC. He was loaned to Vancouver's USL Pro affiliate Charleston Battery. He made his debut on 29 March 2014 in a 2–2 draw against Richmond Kickers.

In 2019, Lewis returned to Jamaica with Portmore United.

On 9 January 2020, Lewis moved back to the United States, joining USL Championship side Colorado Springs Switchbacks.

On 18 January, 2022, Lewis signed for USL Championship side Hartford Athletic.

International

Lewis has played for Jamaica at the U17 and U20 levels while featuring in tournaments in Mexico.  He also scored a goal for Jamaica at the 2011 U17 World Cup. Lewis made his senior national team debut versus Honduras on 16 February 2017.

Honours 

Portmore United
 Winner: 2012 Jamaica National Premier League, 2019 2018–19 National Premier League.

References

External links 
 

1994 births
Living people
Jamaican footballers
Jamaican expatriate footballers
Portmore United F.C. players
Vancouver Whitecaps FC players
Whitecaps FC 2 players
Charleston Battery players
Portland Timbers 2 players
Colorado Springs Switchbacks FC players
Hartford Athletic players
Association football midfielders
Expatriate soccer players in the United States
Expatriate soccer players in Canada
Vancouver Whitecaps FC draft picks
USL Championship players
People from Spanish Town
National Premier League players
2019 CONCACAF Gold Cup players
Jamaica international footballers